The dollar was the currency of Mongolia between 1921 and 1925. Treasury notes were issued under Baron Ungern in 1921. The denominations were 10, 20, 50 and 100 dollars. It was intended to replace the Chinese yuan at par but, according to European travellers of the time, was worthless. Further banknotes were printed in 1924, in denominations of 50 cents, 1, 3, 5, 10 and 25 dollars, but were not issued. The dollar, together with other circulating currencies, was replaced by the tögrög in 1925.

References

The Coins and Banknotes of Mongolia, Ulaanbaatar, 2002.

External links

Currencies of Asia
1920s in Mongolia
Modern obsolete currencies
1920s economic history
1921 establishments in Mongolia
1925 disestablishments in Asia
20th-century disestablishments in Mongolia